Don Cox (born January 14, 1964 in Belhaven, North Carolina) is an American country music singer.

Cox began his career as a member of the Super Grit Cowboy Band. Between 1994 and 1996, he released two albums on Step One Records. His 1994 single "All Over Town" peaked at number 53 on the Billboard Hot Country Singles & Tracks chart.

Cox unsuccessfully ran for election as a Beaufort County commissioner in 2014 and 2016. In 2019 he ran unsuccessfully in the Republican Party primary for the North Carolina 3rd congressional district special election.  Cox finished in a distant 15th place out of 17 candidates garnering 251 votes out of 42,175 votes cast or 0.6 of the vote.

Discography

Albums

Singles

Music videos

References

1964 births
American country singer-songwriters
American male singer-songwriters
Living people
Country musicians from North Carolina
People from Belhaven, North Carolina
Step One Records artists
Singer-songwriters from North Carolina